Naustdal is a former municipality in the old Sogn og Fjordane county, Norway. It was located in the traditional district of Sunnfjord. The administrative centre was the village of Naustdal, which has 1,188 inhabitants (2017).  Other villages in Naustdal include Indrevevring and Helle. The municipality became part of Sunnfjord Municipality in Vestland county on 1 January 2020.

Naustdal was situated between the towns of Førde and Florø, along the Norwegian National Road 5 highway. The Naustdal Tunnel ran through the mountains to connect to the town of Florø. At the time of its dissolution in 2020, the  municipality is the 251st largest by area out of the 422 municipalities in Norway. Naustdal is the 276th most populous municipality in Norway with a population of 2,793.

Naustdal was a farming community with diversity and cultural activities ranging from annual art exhibitions at Vevring to fairs, music, and dancing. Several renowned artists and writers come from Naustdal. Some of the local farmers breed horses, and horse shows are held every second year. Athletes from Naustdal do very well both in national and international championships, especially in volleyball and weightlifting. Naustdal offers rich opportunities for outdoor life such as fishing on the fjord from hired boats. The famous salmon river, Nausta, is in one of the county's largest wilderness areas with mountains, streams, lakes, and mountain farms, and it attracts many tourists from around the world. A recreational area and marina have recently been laid out near the center of Naustdal.

General information

The parish of Naustdal was established as a municipality on 1 January 1896 when it was split off from the large municipality of Førde. Initially, Naustdal had a population of 2,543. During the 1960s, there were many municipal mergers across Norway due to the work of the Schei Committee. On 1 January 1964, all of Naustdal that was located north of the Førdefjorden (population: 1,633) and all of the municipality of Vevring that was to the north of the Førdefjorden (population: 439) were merged to form the new municipality of Naustdal. The parts of Naustdal that were located south of the Førdefjorden (population: 265) were transferred to the municipality of Førde.

On 1 January 2020, the neighboring municipalities of Jølster, Førde, Naustdal, and Gaular were merged to form the new Sunnfjord Municipality.

Name
The municipality (originally the parish) is named after the Naustdal farm since the first Naustdal Church was built there. The first element is naust which means "boathouse" and the last element is dalr which means "valley" or "dale". The name of the river Nausta is also derived from the name of the farm.

Coat of arms
The coat of arms was granted on 11 December 1987. The blue and white arms are canting. The two colors are divided by a jagged line which symbolizes the profile of the gables of three boathouses. The reason they are canting is that the Norwegian word naust means the gable roof of a boathouse.

Churches
The Church of Norway had two parishes within the municipality of Naustdal. It was part of the Sunnfjord prosti (deanery) in the Diocese of Bjørgvin.

Government
All municipalities in Norway, including Naustdal, are responsible for primary education (through 10th grade), outpatient health services, senior citizen services, unemployment and other social services, zoning, economic development, and municipal roads. The municipality is governed by a municipal council of elected representatives, which in turn elect a mayor.  The municipality falls under the Sogn og Fjordane District Court and the Gulating Court of Appeal.

Municipal council
The municipal council  of Naustdal was made up of 21 representatives that were elected to four year terms. The party breakdown of the final municipal council was as follows:

Mayor

The mayor (ordførar) of a municipality in Norway is a representative of the majority party of the municipal council who is elected to lead the council. Håkon Myrvang of the Norwegian Labour Party was elected to the position in 2007 and has been re-elected for each term since then.

Geography
Naustdal is located on the north shore of the Førdefjorden, stretching from the mouth of the fjord to the east, almost reaching to the end of the fjord. It is bordered to the north by the municipalities of Flora and Gloppen, to the east by Jølster, to the south by Førde, and to the south and west by Askvoll.

Climate
The climate in Naustdal is wet with a short summer and a mild winter. There are great regional differences in the climate. There is snow rarely more than a week furthest out in the fjord.

Fishing

Inland fishing
The municipality of Naustdal is ideal for freshwater fishing. Over 30 lakes and connecting streams contain trout. Many of the lakes also contain char. Most of your catch will be small fish but will taste delicious when fried in a pan. In the right places, you can also catch really big fish– trout have been caught in this area.

Salmon and sea trout fishing
The Nausta river is one of the best rivers for salmon in Sogn og Fjordane county. The stretch from the fjord to the Hovefoss waterfall is also good for sea trout fishing. The small Redal water system contains small salmon, sea trout, trout, and char. Small salmon and sea trout are best caught during floods.

Sea fishing
Naustdal has  of shoreline bordering on the fjord. Distances from motor roads to the sea are short at all locations. In outlying, non-farming areas, fishing from the seashore is unrestricted. Fishing from boats on the fjord using a rod or line is free for all. The main types of fish caught in the area include cod, saithe, mackerel, herring, salmon, and sea trout, although every type of fish commonly found in Norwegian waters can be caught here. The Russenes recreational area near the sound at Ålesundet is an excellent place for fishing from land, offering a one-mile shoreline. For boat fishing trips contact boat rental agents or the "Russenes Tur og Fiske", who will bring you to the best fishing places.

Attractions

Nausta river
From the old bridge across the Nausta river near the waterfall Naustdalsfossen you can watch salmon conquer the waterfall in powerful leaps—unless they are caught by rivaling anglers on the banks of the plunging pool. Hooking the fish is difficult — landing it a work of art. The local landowners will show you the best fishing places. Fishing permits may be purchased at the local petrol station or from the landowners.

Mountains
The large mountain area in the eastern part of Naustdal offers a wealth of scenery. There are large lakes and connecting streams. The trout fishing is excellent and fishing permits are available. "Longvasshytta", a self-catering cabin for hikers, can be reached after a 6-hour hike from the nearest road.

Russenes
Recreational grounds have been laid out at Russeneset near the inlet Ålesundet. Several footpaths in the area are signposted. Along the paths, you will find information posters about cultural history, flora, and fauna. Excellent for fishing, swimming, bird watching or just walking.

Sanden Beach
Recreational grounds are laid out along the fjord near the center of Naustdal. There is a marina, sandy beach, diving tower, and a place for beach volleyball.

Air Combat Museum
The museum covers the air battle between German and British aircraft over Sunnfjord on 9 February 1945, also known at the Black Friday. In the museum there are objects from the battles, airplane parts, maps, and photographs. It has a rich collection of splendid model airplanes from the navigator Bernard Nicholl, who participated in the battles.

Notable residents

See also
List of former municipalities of Norway

References

External links
Municipal fact sheet from Statistics Norway 
Naustdal Kommune
NRK Municipality encyclopedia

 
Sunnfjord
Former municipalities of Norway
1896 establishments in Norway
2020 disestablishments in Norway